Almir Memić may refer to:

Almir Memić (footballer, born 1962), Bosnian football manager and former footballer
Almir Memić (footballer, born 1975), Bosnian former footballer